Cary Gilbert (March 20, 1942 – February 15, 1993) was an American lyricist who wrote songs with Kenneth Gamble and Leon Huff at Philadelphia International Records in the 1970s. Among the songs he co-wrote are the international #1 hits "Me and Mrs. Jones" and "Don't Leave Me This Way."

Gilbert, widely known as "Hippy," grew up in Camden, New Jersey, and became friends with Gamble and Huff when the two were members of Kenny Gamble & the Romeos.  After holding several jobs and marrying, Gilbert turned to songwriting with Gamble and Huff and penned the lyrics for Billy Paul's hit "Me and Mrs. Jones" in 1972. He also wrote the lyrics for "Don't Leave Me This Way," originally a track on Harold Melvin & the Blue Notes' 1975 album Wake Up Everybody and later an international hit for Thelma Houston, whose version was nominated for Best R&B Song at the 1978 Grammy Awards. Gilbert also co-wrote "Livin' for the Weekend" and "Your Body's Here With Me (But Your Mind Is on the Other Side of Town)" for The O'Jays, “Don’t Let the Music Slip Away” for Archie Bell & the Drells, and "Let's Clean Up the Ghetto" for the Philadelphia International All-Stars.

Gilbert died in February 1993, at age 50, from complications associated with diabetes.

References

1942 births
1993 deaths
Musicians from Camden, New Jersey
Songwriters from New Jersey
Philadelphia International Records artists
Songwriters from Pennsylvania
20th-century American composers